Benoît Guy Jean Poulain (born 27 July 1987) is a French professional footballer who plays as a centre-back for  club Nîmes.

Career
On 14 July 2022, Poulain returned to Nîmes on a one-season deal.

Career statistics

Honours
Club Brugge
 Belgian Super Cup: 2016, 2018
 Belgian Pro League: 2016, 2018

References

External links

1987 births
Living people
French footballers
Association football midfielders
Nîmes Olympique players
K.V. Kortrijk players
Club Brugge KV players
Kayserispor footballers
K.A.S. Eupen players
Ligue 2 players
Championnat National players
Belgian Pro League players
Süper Lig players
French expatriate footballers
French expatriate sportspeople in Belgium
Expatriate footballers in Belgium
French expatriate sportspeople in Turkey
Expatriate footballers in Turkey